The Panopticon is a prison design by Jeremy Bentham (1786).

Panopticon may also refer to:

Buildings
 Britannia Panopticon or The Panopticon, names for the Britannia Music Hall, Glasgow, Scotland
 Panopticons, an arts and regeneration project to construct landmarks in East Lancashire, England

Music
 Panopticon (band), an American black metal/bluegrass project created by Austin Lunn
 Panopticon (album), by Isis, 2004
 "Panopticon" (song), by Smashing Pumpkins, 2012

Other uses
 The Panopticon (book), a book by Jenni Fagan
 Panopticon Software, a data visualization software company
 Panopticon, a book for the Eclipse Phase role playing game
 The Panopticon Chamber, a location on the planet Gallifrey in the science fiction series Doctor Who

See also
 Panoptes, a Greek mythological name
 Panopticism, a social theory developed by Michel Foucault
 Banopticon
 Opticon (disambiguation)
 "Panopticom", a 2023 song by Peter Gabriel